The second Four Hills tournament was the first one to use the traditional event order of Oberstdorf in December, the New Year's event in Garmisch-Partenkirchen, then Innsbruck and the final in Bischofshofen on Three Kings' Day.

Participating nations and athletes

Jeremy Baig was the first non-European to compete at the Four Hills. Finland was represented for the first time and achieved good results (5 podiums). The defending champion was Sepp Bradl.

The following athletes are on the FIS record, although it is likely incomplete.

Results

Oberstdorf
 Schattenbergschanze, Oberstdorf
31 December 1953

Garmisch-Partenkirchen
 Große Olympiaschanze, Garmisch-Partenkirchen
01 January 1954

Innsbruck
 Bergiselschanze, Innsbruck
03 January 1954

Bischofshofen
 Paul-Ausserleitner-Schanze, Bischofshofen
06 January 1954

After three victories in three events, Olaf Bjørnstad was leading the tournament ranking by 27.5 points ahead of Eino Kirjonen. Defending champion Sepp Bradl was already 51 points behind, but was able to secure the Bischofshofen victory and a third place overall.

Final ranking

References

External links
 FIS website
 Four Hills Tournament web site

Four Hills Tournament
1953 in ski jumping
1954 in ski jumping